Chun Ho is an early gunboat of the Qing Dynasty.

History
Before her purchase, the ship was named Pu Lu. She was purchased on 1 September 1856, funded by shipping merchants in Shanghai as a response to an increase in privacy due to the Taiping Rebellion. She was transferred to Shanghai's Pirate Suppression Bureau, where she was named Tieh Pi and used as an armed patrol vessel. She was transferred to the Ever Victorious Army, and later transferred back to Governor Li Hongzhang's fleet, where she returned to patrol duties.

In 1882, the ship was refitted with a new hull by the Jiangnan Shipyard and renamed Chun Ho.

After the Xinhai Revolution of 1911, Chun Ho remained active. She was assigned into Zhili clique warlord Sun Chuanfang's 1st Fleet. In March 1927, she was captured by the National Revolutionary Army as part of their Northern Expedition.

In the 1930s, she was transferred to the  naval academy. Her further fate is unknown.

Citations

References

 
 
 
 

Naval ships of Imperial China
Naval ships of China
Gunboats of the Republic of China Navy